"Sarah" is a song by Australian alternative rock band Eskimo Joe, released in September 2006 as the second single from their third studio album, Black Fingernails, Red Wine (2006). The song peaked at number 12 on the Australian Singles Chart. At the ARIA Music Awards of 2007, the song was nominated for ARIA Award for Best Group.

Music video
The music video features the band playing in a concert hall and a fourth person can be seen playing with the band.

Track listing

Charts

Weekly charts

Year-end charts

Release history

References

External links
 "Sarah" videoclip
 Youtube "Sarah" videoclip

Eskimo Joe songs
2006 singles
2006 songs
Mushroom Records singles
Songs written by Joel Quartermain
Songs written by Kavyen Temperley
Songs written by Stuart MacLeod (musician)
Warner Music Australasia singles